Special Operations Group may refer to:

 Special Operations Group (Argentina), a commando-like unit of the Argentine Air Force 
 Victoria Police Special Operations Group of the Victoria Police (Australia)
 Tasmania Police Special Operations Group of the Tasmania Police (Australia)
 GOE (Brazil), Special Operations Group of Brazil
 Canadian Special Operations Forces Command
 Grupo de Operaciones Policiales Especiales (Chile) of Chile
 

 Special Operations Group (Japan), former name of the group of Japan
 Special Operations Group (India), of Jammu and Kashmir, India
 Special Operation Group, of Odisha, India

 Grupo de Operaciones Especiales (Mexico) 

 Naval Special Operations Group of the Philippine Navy
 Grupo de Operações Especiais (Portugal)
 Raggruppamento Operativo Speciale of Italy
 Grupo Especial de Operaciones of Spain
 Grupo de Operaciones Especiales (Spain), of the Spanish Army
 Special Operations Group (Czech Republic)
 Special Operations Group of Special Activities Center in the American Central Intelligence Agency
 Groups within the United States Special Operations Command
 27th Special Operations Group, a unit of the United States Air Force
 352d Special Operations Group, a unit of the United States Air Force
 353d Special Operations Group, a unit of the United States Air Force
 State Protection Group, New South Wales
 Specialist Operations, London Police
 Metropolitan Police Specialist Firearms Command, London Police

See also 
 Special Forces Group (disambiguation)
 Special Operations Command (disambiguation)
 Special Operations Unit (disambiguation)